Amanda Kurtović (born 25 July 1991) is a Norwegian handball player who plays as a right back for Larvik HK and formerly the Norwegian national team.  She has won medals at Olympic, World and European level.

International honours
Olympic Games:
Winner: 2012
Bronze Medalist: 2016
World Championship:
Winner: 2011, 2015
Silver Medalist: 2017
European Championship
Winner: 2016
EHF Champions League: 
Winner: 2011
Bronze Medalist: 2018
EHF Cup Winners' Cup
Winner: 2014
Junior European Championship:
Winner: 2009

Individual awards 
 All-Star Team Right Wing of the Junior European Championship: 2009
 All-Star Right Back of Grundigligaen: 2016/2017
 Most Valuable Player of Grundigligaen: 2016/2017 
 Prosport Best Right Back of the Romanian Liga Națională: 2018

Personal life 
She was born in Sweden to a Swedish mother and Croatian father, the handball coach and former player Marinko Kurtović. Her brother William is a professional footballer who represented Sweden internationally on youth level. Her family moved to Sandefjord, Norway, when she was six because her father signed a contract with the local club.

References

External links

Norwegian female handball players
1991 births
Living people
Handball players at the 2012 Summer Olympics
Handball players at the 2016 Summer Olympics
Olympic handball players of Norway
Olympic gold medalists for Norway
Olympic bronze medalists for Norway
Olympic medalists in handball
Viborg HK players
Medalists at the 2012 Summer Olympics
Medalists at the 2016 Summer Olympics
Expatriate handball players
Norwegian expatriate sportspeople in Denmark
Norwegian expatriate sportspeople in Romania
Norwegian expatriate sportspeople in Hungary
Norwegian expatriate sportspeople in Turkey
People from Sandefjord
Swedish emigrants to Norway
Naturalised citizens of Norway
Swedish people of Croatian descent
Norwegian people of Croatian descent
Norwegian people of Swedish descent
21st-century Norwegian women